Estadio Ciudad de Cumaná is a multi-purpose stadium in Ayacucho, Huamanga, Peru.  It is currently used mostly for football matches and is the home stadium of Ayacucho FC of the Peruvian Primera División and Deportivo Municipal de Huamanga of the Copa Perú league. The stadium holds 12,000 spectators. It was built to commemorate the 150th anniversary of the Battle of Ayacucho by the government of Venezuela under the leadership of Carlos Andrés Pérez. It is named after the city of Cumaná which is the birthplace of Antonio José de Sucre who was the commander of the United Liberation Army during the Battle of Ayacucho. It is part of the larger Complejo Deportivo Venezuela or Venezuela Sports Complex which includes other sporting facilities built by the Venezuelan government.

References

External links
Stadium information

Cuidad de Cumana
Buildings and structures in Ayacucho Region
1974 establishments in Peru
Sports venues completed in 1974